Fernando Manzaneque Sánchez (4 February 1934 – 5 June 2004) was a Spanish professional road racing cyclist born in Campo de Criptana. Fernando was the older brother of Jesús Manzaneque.

Major Results

1955
1st Stage 9 Vuelta a Andalucía
1957
1st Stages 3 & 5 Tour du Maroc
1st Stage 7 Vuelta a Asturias
1958
1st Stage 2 Volta a Catalunya
3rd Overall Vuelta a España
1959
1st Stage 6 Vuelta a Andalucía
1st Stage 17 Vuelta a España
1960
1st Stage 18 Tour de France
1st Stages 5 & 7 Vuelta a Andalucía
1st Overall Vuelta a Levante
1st Stage 8
6th Overall Vuelta a España
1961
1st Stage 4 Bicicleta Eibarresa
1st Stage 6 Critérium du Dauphiné Libéré
6th Overall Tour de France
7th Overall Vuelta a España
1962
1st Overall Vuelta a Levante
8th Overall Vuelta a España
1963
1st Trofeo Jaumendreu
1st Overall Grand Prix du Midi Libre
1st Stage 4
1st Stage 16 Tour de France
1st Stage 5 Volta a Catalunya
1964
6th Overall Vuelta a España
1965
4th Overall Vuelta a España
1st Stage 5
1967
10th Overall Tour de France
1st Stage 16

External links

 

1934 births
2004 deaths
Sportspeople from the Province of Ciudad Real
Spanish male cyclists
Spanish Tour de France stage winners
Spanish Vuelta a España stage winners
Cyclists from Castilla-La Mancha